The  is a private high school in Kai, Yamanashi, Japan. It was established by Japan Aviation in partnership with Japan Airlines as a corporate educational institution to promote the teaching of industrial technology, and is part of the Japan Aviation Academy. Most graduates go to a special advanced school established as an annex. Very few students continue to the university level.

References

External links 
Japan Aviation High School

Aviation schools
Educational institutions established in 1960
Schools in Japan
1960 establishments in Japan